Sava (pennant number P-802) was a Flutto-class submarine in service with the Yugoslav Navy ( – JRM). Built by Cantieri Riuniti dell'Adriatico in Monfalcone during the Second World War, Sava was laid down and completed as Nautilo for service with the Italian Regia Marina (Royal Navy).

The boat was scuttled by her crew in September 1943 following the Italian armistice. She was salvaged by German forces and commissioned in the Kriegsmarine as UIT-19, only to be sunk again in an Allied air raid in 1944. After the war, the Yugoslav Navy salvaged her for the second time, commissioning her as Sava and operating her until 1971.

Design and construction 
Sava was laid down on 3 January 1942 as Nautilo, the eighth boat of the Type 1 Flutto-class submarines that were being built for the Regia Marina (Royal Navy) by Cantieri Riuniti dell'Adriatico, Monfalcone. The boat was launched on 20 March 1943 and completed by 26 July the same year.

The boat displaced  when surfaced and  when submerged.

Main armament consisted of six  torpedo tubes with a complement of 12 torpedoes. Other weapons included a single /47 gun, four /70 guns and/or four . The boat's crew consisted of four to five officers and 44 to 48 seamen.

Service history 
Following the Italian armistice in September 1943, Nautilo was scuttled in Venice harbour. The boat was then refloated by German forces and commissioned in the Kriegsmarine as UIT-19. The boat was once again sunk on 9 January 1944 in Pula, during an air raid carried out by the Royal Air Force. After the end of the war, the boat was raised by the Yugoslav Navy ( – JRM) and moved to the Uljanik Shipyard where she underwent repairs which lasted from 1947 to 1949. The boat was commissioned in 1949 as Sava (pennant number P-802), and with the Mališan (P-901) and Tara (P-801), formed the basis of the new Yugoslav submarine fleet.

In 1958 the boat was relegated to training duties, followed by a major refit which lasted from 1958 to 1960. The refit involved removing her 100 mm deck gun and reconstruction of the conning tower in order to make it more streamlined. She continued serving as a training vessel until she was stricken in 1971.
She became a night club in the Croatian town of Dubrovnik called "Yellow submarine".

See also 
List of ships of the Yugoslav Navy

Notes

References 

1943 ships
Ships built by Cantieri Riuniti dell'Adriatico
Flutto-class submarines
World War II submarines of Italy
Scuttled vessels
Naval ships of Italy captured by Germany during World War II
Submarines of the Kriegsmarine
Submarines sunk by aircraft
Ships sunk by British aircraft
Submarines of Yugoslavia